The Armenian Catholic Archeparchy of Lviv is a former, non-Metropolitan archeparchy (Eastern Catholic archdiocese) of the Armenian Catholic Church sui iuris (Armenian Rite). It existed in 1630 to 1944.

It is immediately dependent on the Armenian Catholic Patriarch of Cilicia, not part of his or any ecclesiastical province, and in Rome under the Congregation for the Oriental Churches.

Its former cathedral archiepiscopal see and a minor landmark of World Heritage, the Armenian Cathedral of the Assumption of Mary in Lviv has been turned into an Armenian Apostolic Church.

History 
Established in 1630 as Archeparchy (Archdiocese) of Lviv (Curiate Italian Leopoli), on territory previously without Ordinary of the particular church sui iuris.

Vacant since World War II. Therefore, its faithful are "also" pastorally served by the Armenian Catholic Ordinariate of Eastern Europe.

Episcopal ordinaries

(all Armenian Rite)

Archeparchs (Archbishops) of Lviv 
 Mikołaj Torosowicz (1630.10.24 – 1681)
 Wartan Hunanian (1681.10.24 – death 1715.06.15), succeeded as former Titular Bishop of Hamatha (1675.01.28 – 1681.10.24) & Coadjutor Archeparch of Lviv of the Armenians (1675.01.28 – 1681.10.24)
 Coadjutor Archeparch Deodat Bogdan Nersesowicz (1701.07.18 – death 1709), Titular Archbishop of Traianopolis (1701.07.18 – 1709)
 Jan Tobiasz Augustynowicz (1715 – 1751.12.22), succeeded as former Titular Archbishop of Ægeæ (1737.02.11 – death 1751.12.22) & Coadjutor of Lviv of the Armenians (1737.02.11 – 1751.12.22
 Jakub Walerian Tumanowicz (1783.01.11 – death 1798.09.02), succeeded as former Titular Archbishop of Camachus (1771.12.16 – 1783.01.11) & Coadjutor Archbishop of Lviv of the Armenians ([1771.06.01] 1771.12.16 – 1783.01.11)
 Jan Jakub Szymonowicz (1800.03.01 – death 1816.10.03)
 Kajetan Augustyn Warteresiewicz (1817.07.27 – death 1831.02.06)
 Samuel Cyryl Stefanowicz (1832.02.24 – death 1858.12.08)
 Grzegorz Michał Szymonowicz (1858.12.08 – death 1875.06), succeeded as former Titular Archbishop of Marcopolis (1857.03.19 – 1857.07.05) & Coadjutor of Lviv of the Armenians (1857.03.19 – 1858.12.08)
 Grzegorz Józef Romaszkan (1876.04.03 – death 1881.12.14)
  Izaak Mikołaj Isakowicz (1882.07.03 – death 1901.04.29)
 Józef Teodorowicz (1901.12.16 – death 1938.12.05)
 Apostolic Administrator Father Dionisiy Kaetanowicz (1938 – 1944), no other office

See also 
 Catholic Church in Ukraine

References

External links 
 GCatholic with incumbent bio links.

1630 establishments in Europe
Armenian Catholic eparchies
Armenian Catholic